The Kids Are All Wrong was an EP released by My Favorite on the Double Agent record label in 2003.

Track listing
  "Burning Hearts" – 5:44  
  "The Radiation" – 3:57  
  "Rescue Us" – 4:17  
  "The Lesser Saints" – 3:21

References

My Favorite albums
2003 EPs